The OTs-27 Berdysh (ОЦ-27 Бердыш, Russian for "poleaxe") is a Russian semi-automatic pistol developed in the early 1990s by TsKIB SOO as a candidate to replace the standard Makarov PM service pistol in service with the Russian Armed Forces.

Variants 
 PSA (ПСА, «пистолет конструкции Стечкина — Авраамова») - test prototype
 OTs-27 (ОЦ-27) - 9×18mm Makarov
 OTs-27-2 (ОЦ-27-2) - 9×19mm Parabellum
 OTs-27-7 (ОЦ-27-7) - 7.62×25mm Tokarev

Users 
  - used as service pistol in Ministry of Internal Affairs and other law enforcement

References

Sources 
 К. Тесемников. Современный "Бердыш" // журнал "Оружейный двор", № 9-10, 1998.
 А. И. Благовестов. То, из чего стреляют в СНГ: Справочник стрелкового оружия. / под общ. ред. А. Е. Тараса. Минск, «Харвест», 2000. стр.65-68
 А. Б. Жук. Энциклопедия стрелкового оружия: револьверы, пистолеты, винтовки, пистолеты-пулемёты, автоматы. — М.: Воениздат, 2002. стр.438-439

External links

KBP Instrument Design Bureau - official site
OTs-27 "Berdysh" - Modern Firearms
 OTs-27 Berdysh / Internet Movie Firearms Database

7.62×25mm Tokarev semi-automatic pistols
9mm Parabellum semi-automatic pistols
9×18mm Makarov semi-automatic pistols
Semi-automatic pistols of Russia
TsKIB SOO products